Tulasne is a surname. Notable people with the surname include:
 Charles Tulasne (1816–1884), French physician, mycologist and illustrator
 Edmond Tulasne (1815–1885), French botanist and mycologist
 Geoffrey Tulasne (born 1988), French footballer
 Thierry Tulasne (born 1963), French tennis player